Papa Legba is a lwa in Haitian Vodou, Winti and Louisiana Voodoo, who serves as the intermediary between the lwa and humanity. He stands at a spiritual crossroads and gives (or denies) permission to speak with the spirits of Guineé, and is believed to speak all human languages. In Haiti, he is the great elocutioner. Legba facilitates communication, speech, and understanding. He is commonly associated with dogs. Papa Legba is invoked at the beginning of every ceremony. Papa Legba has his origins in the historic West African kingdom of Dahomey, located within present-day Benin.

Appearance
He usually appears as an old man on a crutch or with a cane, wearing a broad-brimmed straw hat and smoking a pipe, or drinking dark rum. The dog is sacred to him. Legba is syncretized with Saint Peter, Saint Lazarus, and Saint Anthony. His veve incorporates a walking cane on the right side. Offerings to him typically include candy.

Legba is a favorite Lwa of children due to his jolly, grandpa-like image. He is often tasked with babysitting and distracting children (a typical male role in the matrilineal religion) while more serious rituals are being performed by the adults.

Alternative views
In Benin, Nigeria, Togo, and Ghana, mainly among the Yoruboid and Gbe (Tadoid) peoples, Legba is viewed as a young and virile trickster deity, often horned and phallic, and his shrine is usually located at the gate of the village in the countryside. Alternatively, he is addressed as Legba Atibon, Atibon Legba, or Ati-Gbon Legba. Papa Legba is thought to have emerged from the Yoruba and Gbe (Tadoid) diaspora as a continuation of the Orisha Eshu. This emerged as Lwa Papa Legba in Haitian vodou, spirit Papa Laba in New Orleans Hoodoo and as the Oricha Elegua in Santeria.

In popular culture
In his study of the Delta blues, Robert Palmer discusses the appearance of Legba in blues lyrics and lore. Palmer notes that Legba can be referred to/identified as "the Devil", "Papa Legba", and "The Black Man" throughout the history of the blues. This is also made clear in ethnomusicologist Bruno Blum's text for the CD box set Voodoo in America, where reference to Papa Legba, deity of roads and crossroads, in Robert Johnson's iconic song "Crossroads" is explained.

There is extensive referencing to voudon in the Sprawl trilogy (1984-1988) by William Gibson. In the second book, Count Zero (1986), Papa Legba stands at the gateway to cyberspace as the "master of roads and pathways," with other loa appearing throughout the book. Papa Legba and Voodoo appear again in Spook Country (2007), a book from one of Gibson's other trilogies.

A 1985 episode of the TV series Miami Vice (Season 2, Episode 8, "Tale of the Goat") centers on a malign Vodou priest by the name of Papa Legba (played by Clarence Williams III). In keeping with the image of Legba often conceptualised in Haitian Vodou subculture, Papa Legba is depicted as "controlling" the gateway to the spiritual world (through the use of drugs), walking with the aid of crutches, and smoking a pipe.

The musical group Talking Heads made a song named after him. The song can be found on their 1986 album (and soundtrack to the David Byrne film of the same name), True Stories. The Danish band Volbeat features what appears to be a cartoon interpretation of Papa Legba in their 2017 animated video for "The Black Rose."

Papa Legba is a recurring character in American Horror Story, appearing in the third and eighth season, as a gatekeeper of the afterlife. He is an acquaintance of Marie Laveau, having granted her immortality in exchange for the offering of one innocent every year. Papa Legba’s portrayal in the show has attracted some criticism, with many noting that the portrayal of Papa Legba was more similar to Baron Samedi than the mythical Papa Legba himself.

See also
 Elegua
 The Father of Spirits

References

 11 Felix Kuadugah, contributor- Legba worship among the Gbe speaking people of Nigeria, Benin , Togo and  Ghana.

External links
 Papa Legba, protector of the home and guardian of gates and crossroads photo from 

Haitian Vodou gods
Crossroads mythology
Liminal deities
Supernatural beings identified with Christian saints